The 2000 FA Women's Charity Shield was the first Women's FA Community Shield, as with its male equivalent, the Community Shield is an annual football match played between the winners of the previous season's league and the previous season's Women's FA Cup. The match was contested between Arsenal and Charlton Athletic, it ended 1-1. It is the only time that the trophy was shared between two teams.

References

Women's FA Community Shield
Community Shield
Community Shield
Community Shield
Community Shield